Imtiaz Super Market (ISM), commonly known as Imtiaz, is a Pakistani supermarket operator that operates a chain of supermarkets across the country. It is estimated that its yearly turnover is between Rs 400 billion to Rs 1000 billion, which makes it a key competitor of Metro Cash & Carry Pakistan and Carrefour Pakistan.

History
Imtiaz Super Market started in 1955 as a small superstore in Bahadurabad, Karachi by Imtiaz Abbasi. it is a big name of trust in the store and supermarket biz and is the largest market chain created in and by a Pakistani 
Project next vision officials cover it has one of the most attractive stores ever 

In 2003, they opened a store in Awami Markaz, Karachi.

In 2010, they expanded by opening a store in Nazimabad, Karachi.
 
In 2013, Imtiaz was opened in Defence, Karachi.

In 2016, hypermarket was opened in Gulshan-e-Iqbal, Karachi. The retailer also expanded to Punjab by opening a supermarket in Gujranwala.

In 2017, a branch was opened in Faisalabad.

In 2018, two more branches were opened in Karachi in the areas of Sharafabad, and Malir by the retailer.

In 2019, a branch was opened in Clifton.

In 2020, operations were started in Lahore.

In 2021, they opened a store in Sialkot.

On 6 August 2021, they opened a store in Bahawalpur.

In 2022, a branch was opened in Vehari.

On 11th November, 2022 a branch was opened in Peshawar.

Stores
The company operates 25 stores throughout the country located in Karachi, Lahore, Islamabad, Peshawar, Faisalabad, Gujranwala, Bahawalpur, Sialkot, Gujrat, Sargodha and Vehari.

References

Companies based in Karachi
Retail companies established in 1955
Supermarkets of Pakistan
Department stores of Pakistan
Pakistani brands
Privately held companies of Pakistan
Pakistani companies established in 1955